Classique Legend (foaled 8 September 2015) is an Australian bred thoroughbred racehorse that is most notable for winning the 2020 running of The Everest.

Background

Classique Legend was sold for A$400,000 at the 2017 Inglis Classic Yearling sale.  He was purchased for Hong Kong businessman Mr Bon Ho.

Racing career

Classique Legend won at his race debut as a three-year-old on the 20 February 2019 at Randwick.  He then went on to win two of his next three starts, culminating in victory in the Arrowfield 3YO Sprint.

At just his eighth career start, Classique Legend raced in The Everest of 2019, where he finished an unlucky sixth placing, beaten 2.5 lengths behind Yes Yes Yes.  Jockey Nash Rawiller said after the race, "I was pretty luckless. I never got a run at all when I needed it."

After victories in the 2020 June Stakes and The Shorts, Classique Legend started the $4.20 favourite in the 2020 edition of The Everest.  Jockey Kerrin McEvoy settled him well back in the field but he went on to defeat Bivouac by 2.5 lengths.

Pedigree

References 

Australian racehorses
Racehorses bred in Australia
Racehorses trained in Australia
2015 racehorse births
Thoroughbred family 1-x